Christopher Taylor may refer to:

Christopher Taylor (archaeologist) (1935–2021), British archaeologist and landscape historian
Christopher Taylor (game designer) (active since 2005), American game designer
Christopher Taylor (pianist) (active since 2000), American pianist
Christopher Taylor (politician) (born 1967), American politician and mayor of Ann Arbor, Michigan
Sohn (musician) (born Christopher Taylor, active since 2012), British electronica musician
Christopher Taylor (Australian footballer) (born 1966), Australian rules footballer
Christopher Taylor (sprinter) (born 1999), Jamaican 400 metre runner
Christopher L. Taylor (1828–1914), Wisconsin State Assemblyman

See also
Chris Taylor (disambiguation)